Landauer is a surname, originally referring to somebody from Landau. It may refer to:

 Carl Landauer (1891–1983), German economist
 Gustav Landauer (1870–1919), German anarchist, writer, and critic
 Kurt Landauer (1884–1961), German football official
 M. H. Landauer (1808–1841), German rabbi and writer on Jewish mysticism
 Robert S. Landauer (1924–2004), American scientist specializing in radiation measurement
 Rolf Landauer (1927–1999), German-American physicist
 Samuel Landauer (1846–1937), German orientalist and librarian
 Thomas Landauer (1932–2014), American professor of psychology
 Walter Landauer (1910–1983), Austrian pianist best known as half of the Rawicz and Landauer piano duo

See also
 Landau (surname)
 Landauer's principle
 Landor (disambiguation)

German-language surnames
Jewish surnames